Miklós Szebeny (18 November 1887 – 18 June 1919) was a Hungarian rower. He competed in the men's eight event at the 1912 Summer Olympics. Three brothers, Antal, György and István, were also Olympic rowers; György was his twin.

References

1887 births
1919 deaths
Hungarian male rowers
Olympic rowers of Hungary
Rowers at the 1912 Summer Olympics
Rowers from Budapest
European Rowing Championships medalists